Baruza is a village in northern Aleppo Governorate, northwestern Syria.  south of Akhtarin and some  northeast of the city of Aleppo, it is situated on the southeastern edge of the Queiq Plain, where the Aqil mountains begin.

The village administratively belongs to Nahiya Akhtarin in Azaz District. Nearby localities include Ghaytun  to the west, and Tall Tanah  to the south. In the 2004 census, Baruza had a population of 992.

References

Villages in Aleppo Governorate
Populated places in Azaz District